Brandon is a rural town and locality in the Shire of Burdekin, Queensland, Australia.

History
Brandon was surveyed as a site for a township in 1882 and the first allotments were sold later that year. The town is named after Henry Brandon a sugar pioneer in the Mackay and Lower Burdekin regions. Henry Brandon was also the son-in-law of the colonist, Korah Halcomb Wills.

Brandon Post Office opened on 6 September 1883.  Prior to that a Receiving office called Pioneer Estate, Lower Burdekin had serviced the area. The Receiving office name was changed to Brandon in August 1883.

Brandon Provisional School opened in the town on 9 April 1888. It became Brandon State School on 11 July 1898.

Kalamia State School opened beside the Kalamia Sugar Mill on 18 July 1928.

Heritage listings 
Brandon has a number of heritage-listed sites, including:
 27 Spiller Street: St Patrick's Catholic Church

Economy 

Brandon is a sugarcane growing area with underground water supplies to irrigate crops. Wilmar Sugar Australia operates two sugar mills in Brandon, the Kalamia Sugar Mill in the north-east of the locality on Lilliesmere Road beside the Lilliesmere Lagoon and the Pioneer Sugar Mill in the west of the locality on Pioneer Mill Road.

Education 
Brandon State School is a government primary (Prep-6) school for boys and girls at Drysdale Street. In 2017, the school had an enrolment of 45 students with 4 teachers and 6 non-teaching staff (4 full-time equivalent).

Kalamia State School is a government primary (Prep-6) school for boys and girls at Lilliesmere Road. In 2017, the school had an enrolment of 14 students with 1 teacher and 5 non-teaching staff (2 full-time equivalent).

There are no secondary schools in Brandon. The nearest government secondary school is Ayr State High School in neighbouring Ayr to the east.

See also 
 List of sugar mills in Queensland
 List of tramways in Queensland

References

External links 

 
 
Burdekin Online
Burdekin Shire Council

Towns in Queensland
Shire of Burdekin
Localities in Queensland